What Would You Do? is a 1920 American silent drama film directed by Edmund Lawrence and Denison Clift. It starring Madlaine Traverse, George A. McDaniel, Frank Elliott, Charles K. French, Lenore Lynard, and Bud Geary. The film was released by Fox Film Corporation in January 1920.

Plot
After Hugh Chilson's (George A. McDaniel) business partner, Le Roi Andrews (Edwin B. Tilton) scams a pair of stockholders for money, Hugh is told by his wife, Claudia Chilson (Madlaine Traverse), and his lawyer, to leave the US and move to South America to avoid jail. Boarding a large ship, Hugh decides to commit suicide by jumping off but only manages to land on a smaller boat, which takes him to South America. Once there, Hugh makes a fortune selling nitrate.

Back home, Claudia marries Curtis Brainerd (Frank Elliott), believing she is now a widow. After Curtis falls off a horse and becomes a cripple, Claudia leaves a gun near him in case he wants to end his suffering. Curtis commits suicide, and Hugh arrives back from South America. Claudia is arrested for assisting Curtis with his death, but Curtis's brother, Robert (Frank Elliott) decides not to press charges after being urged not to. Wanting a new start, Hugh decides to go back to South America with Claudia.

Cast
Madlaine Traverse as Claudia Chilson
George A. McDaniel as Hugh Chilson
Frank Elliott as Curtis Brainerd
Charles K. French as Robert Brainerd
Lenore Lynard as Lily Brainerd
Bud Geary as Tom Holbrook
Edwin B. Tilton as Le Roi Andrews
Cordelia Callahan as Nurse

Preservation
The film is now considered lost.

References

External links

1920 drama films
Fox Film films
Silent American drama films
1920 films
American silent feature films
American black-and-white films
Lost American films
1920 lost films
Lost drama films
1920s American films